Kantilal Rathod was an Indian film maker known for his work in Gujarati and Hindi cinema. He directed the 1969 Gujarati film Kanku which won National Film Award for Best Feature Film in Gujarati at the 17th National Film Awards.

Biography
Born on 12 December 1924 in Raipur, India, Rathod grew up in Bengali atmosphere. He studied Art at Shantiniketan, and went to America to study Animation and Cartoon film at Art Institute of Chicago. He taught documentary film making and editing at Circus University, America during 1954-56. He made a short film Cloven Horizon about children's paintings for the same institute. The film was distributed by Encyclopædia Britannica. He briefly worked with Scottish Canadians animator and director Norman McLaren. He died on 28 September 1988.

Filmography
Anjam (1940)
Mr. and Mrs. Peacock (1956)
Buddhu Aur DCM (1959) (Documentary)
Withering Flowers (1960) (Short film)
Cloven Horizon (1965) (Documentary)
Adventures of a Sugar Doll (1965)
The Parts That Build the Auto (1966) (Documentary)
Peace-Time Armada (1967) (Short film)
Pinjra (1968) (Short film)
Kanku (1969)
Strife to Stability (1969) (Documentary)
Freedom Freedom (1971) (Documentary)
Tested Berries (1973) (Short film)
Short Cut (1973) (Short film)
Parinay (1974)
Sardar Vallabhai Patel (1976) (Documentary)
Zangbo and the Zing Zing Bar (1977)
Ramnagari (1982)
The Choice Is Yours (1982) (Documentary)
Doongar Ro Bhed (1985)
Save Energy Through Efficient Motors (1989) (Documentary)

Accolades
His film Parinay won the 1974 Nargis Dutt Award for Best Feature Film on National Integration (known as the "Rajat Kamal Special Award for the Best Feature Film on National Integration" at that time) presented by the Directorate of Film Festivals (DFF). The DFF also gave Samantar Chitra Private Limited a Rajat Kamal (Silver Lotus), and a certificate; Rathod got a Rajat Kamal, and a certificate. Rathod's film Cloven Horizon won the best documentary film in 1965. The same year he won the National Film Award for Best Children's Film for The Adventures of Sugar Doll at 13th National Film Awards.

References

External links
 

Gujarati-language film directors
Film directors from Gujarat